Jukka Henri Kristian Backlund (born 30 December 1982, Helsinki) is a Finnish music producer and multi-instrumentalist. Backlund was previously a member of the Finnish rock band Sunrise Avenue, where he played keyboards. He is best known for producing their first album, On the Way to Wonderland, which is the best-selling international debut from Finland. Many of the songs on the album were co-written by Backlund and the lead singer Samu Haber, including the singles "Fairytale Gone Bad" and "Forever Yours".

As a musician, Backlund has worked as a bandleader and keyboardist for numerous artists since he started his professional career in 1998. In 2011, he founded the pop-fusion band DEAD SIRIUS 3000 with his brother Tapio Backlund and guitarist Petteri Sariola. In this band, Backlund plays drums.

Backlund started studying classical piano at the age of five. Later, he studied jazz and musical composition in the youth department of Sibelius Academy. His father was jazz musician Kaj Backlund.

Awards
 2 Finnish Grammy Awards
 6 NRJ Radio Awards
 European Border Breaker Award
 Eska Award
 Impala Award
 Radio Regenbogen Award

Selected discography
Backlund has contributed to these records, among others:

References

External links
 
 
 Sunrise Avenue biography
 DEAD SIRIUS 3000 Official website

1982 births
Living people
Finnish male musicians
Finnish record producers
Musicians from Helsinki
Businesspeople from Helsinki
Finnish bandleaders